Beforona is a town and commune in Madagascar. It belongs to the district of Moramanga, which is a part of Alaotra-Mangoro Region. The population of the commune was estimated to be approximately 20,380 in 2018.

It is situated at the RN 2 from Antananarivo to Toamasina, or about 49 km from Moramanga.

Primary and junior level secondary education are available in town. The majority of the population of the commune are farmers.  The most important crop is rice, while other important products are bananas,  coffee and Ginger.  Services provide employment for 1% of the population.

References and notes 

Populated places in Alaotra-Mangoro